is a fictional character and the main protagonist  of the Yu-Gi-Oh! manga series created by Kazuki Takahashi. Yugi is introduced as a teenager who is solving an ancient Egyptian puzzle known as the Millennium Puzzle, hoping it will grant him his wish of forming bonds. Yugi revives an ancient spirit called  (Dark Yugi in the English translation and Yami Yugi in the English dub of the anime). During the series, Yugi forms friendships with the supporting cast, interacts with Atem and learns about his secrets. Besides the original manga, Yugi has also appeared in the anime adaptations, films and video games based on the franchise. His signature monster is the Dark Magician.

Yugi was created as a weak, young man who is interested in games and becomes a hero when playing them. According to Takahashi, through this trait, Yugi emphasizes the series' themes; friendship and the enjoyment of games. Atem was created as a hero who would appeal to young children through his strong characterization.

Critical reception to Yugi has been mixed; some writers found Yami Yugi to be too dark for the series but others praised the development of both Yugi and his lookalike alter-ego. His role in movies, mostly The Dark Side of Dimensions, was also praised for featuring a more mature version of the character.

Creation and development

Kazuki Takahashi had always been interested in games; he was obsessed with them as a child and was still interested in them as an adult. He believed games made players into heroes. He decided to base the Yu-Gi-Oh! series around such games and used this idea as the premise. Yugi was a weak, childish boy who became a hero when he played games. Friendship is one of the major themes of Yu-Gi-Oh!; Takahashi based the names of the two major characters "Yūgi" and "Jōnouchi" on the word yūjō (友情), which means "friendship". Henshin, the ability to turn oneself into something or someone else, is something Takahashi believed all children dream of. He considered Yugi's "henshin" Dark Yugi, a savvy, invincible games player, to appeal to children.

Takahashi believes modern society focuses too much on winners and losers. For example, the author believes the regular Yugi and Katsuya Jonouchi (known as Joey Wheeler in the English anime) to have more potential as characters because they only focus on enjoying games. He felt Yami Yugi and Seto Kaiba are weaker characters despite the former's heroic traits. As a result, he believes Dark Yugi is at his best when he is being supported by the rest of the cast.

According to Takahashi, while Yugi and Kaiba are rivals, they are not close friends. He believes, however, the most important part of their relationship is before Yugi's duel against Marik's alter-ego. Before the game begins, Kaiba passes Yugi a card that could help him in the game. This scene felt like one of the most difficult scenes to write because of the pair's rivalry.

In the first anime adaption of the manga, Megumi Ogata voiced the main character and Shunsuke Kazama replaced her for the following one. Dan Green was Yugi's and Yami Yugi's voice actor in U.S. anime episodes. Ogata recalls that the director chose her to voice Yugi and told her, "I can feel the scent of darkness from you" which Ogata believes refers to Yugi's anti-heroic alter-ego. This work was raised from scratch when Kazama had no experience as a voice actor and did not know how to do it. Due to the latest movie taking place after the finale, Kazama portrayed him more mature. Green has used two voice pitches for Yugi's and Yami's voices and enjoyed the parodies his work led to in the form of an abridged series.

Appearances

In Yu-Gi-Oh!

Yugi Mutou is the main protagonist of the story. However, he is bullied by two classmates, Katsuya Jonouchi and Hiroto Honda, with the former stealing a piece. When the school's hall monitor (named Ushio) beats up the two of them, Yugi comes to the bullies' defence and gets beaten up by Ushio. This causes Jonouchi to return the stolen piece to Yugi's grandfather, who later gives Yugi the piece. Yugi completes the Millennium Puzzle which causes him to be possessed by another person. According to the book of the dead, whoever solves the Millennium puzzle inherits the shadow games, becomes the guardian of right and passes judgement on evil.

After the Millennium Puzzle's soul, Dark Yugi defeats Ushio in a game, Yugi becomes friends with Jonouchi. Across the following chapters he also forms bonds with other characters, most notably his crush, Anzu Mazaki (Téa Gardner in the English anime), who instead develops a crush for Yugi's alter-ego, and Honda. During the story, Yugi meets a teenager named Seto Kaiba obsessed with a card game known as Duel Monsters. He takes the Blue Eyes White-Dragon from Yugi while at school—the card actually belonging to Yugi's grandfather, Sugoroku Mutou (Solomon Mutou in the English dub)— and swaps it for a fake. Sugoroku considers the card his most precious treasure he got from a friend. After Kaiba destroys the card and psychologically tortures the grandfather, Yugi and his friends enter Kaiba's Death-T challenge to end the torture. At the end Yugi and Kaiba have a duel, in which Yugi defeats him. This results into a rivalry as Kaiba seeks to have his rematch against both Yugi and Dark Yugi.

Shortly after Kaiba's defeat, Yugi receives an invitation to the Duel Monsters tournaments held by Maximillion J. Pegasus (Pegasus J. Crawford in Japanese versions). In order to lure him out, Pegasus steals Sugoroku's soul with his Millennium Eye. Yugi and Jonouchi go to the tournament, with the latter seeking to use the prize money to use it for an operation to restore his sister's eyesight. Accompanied by Anzu and Honda, Yugi and Jonouchi defeat multiple duelists but Yugi is forced to let himself to be defeated by Kaiba; the soul of Mokuba Kaiba, Seto Kaiba's brother, had also been stolen. With the help of a former rival, Mai Kujaku (Mai Valentine in the English anime), Yugi manages to reach Pegasus' mansion. Following the tournament, Yugi and Yami are able to defeat Pegasus. While Pegasus restores the stolen souls, Yugi gives Jonouchi the prize money for the medical treatment of his sister, Shizuka Kawai (Serenity Wheeler in the English anime).

Some time after Pegasus' tournament, Dark Yugi learns from a woman named Ishizu Ishtar that he was once a Pharaoh but his memory was erased during a conflict. Shortly after this, Kaiba announces his own tournament – Battle City – where every loser in the competition has to give the winner their most valuable card. A group of hunters led by Ishizu's corrupted younger brother, Marik, are set to challenge Yugi, having a vendetta against the Pharaoh. In one duel, Yugi is faced by Osiris, the Sky Dragon: one of the three Egyptian God Cards which are recognized as the three strongest cards. Yugi defeats Marik's hunter and earns Osiris. He later uses it to defeat Yami Bakura and once again to confront Kaiba in a rematch, as his rival uses the second God Card: Obelisk the Tormentor. Yugi defeats Kaiba and obtains Obelisk. In the finale, Yugi faces Marik's own darker alter-ego who has the third God Card: The Winged Dragon of Ra. Using a card Kaiba previously passed him, Yugi defeats Marik, obtains Ra and becomes the tournament's champion.
 

During the final story arc of the manga, Dark Yugi uses the three God Cards to learn of his past. He is transported to an alternate version of his life where he lived as a Pharaoh. During this time, the Pharaoh clashes against Yami Bakura multiple times while Yugi and his friends search for a way to aid him. The group is  able to defeat Zorc and his avatar, Dark Bakura. After this, Yugi engages Atem in a final duel to help him move on to the afterlife.

In other media
In Yu-Gi-Oh R, which takes place following Yugi's victory in the Battle City tournament. Yako Tenma, student and adopted son of Maximillion Pegasus, decides to avenge his teacher's defeat at the hands of Yugi, believing him to be responsible for Pegasus' alleged death. Tenma kidnaps Téa Gardner, prompting Yugi and his friend Joey Wheeler to face Tenma's RA Project and the duel professors.

He is also present Yu-Gi-Oh! Capsule Monsters where Yugi goes with his friends to find the missing Solomon Moto. In their journey, Yugi realizes that somehow they have been transported into the world of Capsule Monsters.

The film Yu-Gi-Oh! The Movie: Pyramid of Light follows a new duel between Yugi and Kaiba. However, the latter has been used by an ancient being known as Anubis who aims to kill the Pharaoh.

Yugi's next appearance is in the movie Yu-Gi-Oh!: Bonds Beyond Time where he joins the duelists Jaden Yuki and Yusei Fudo to defeat the mysterious Paradox.

In Yu-Gi-Oh!: The Dark Side of Dimensions Yugi and his closest friends are in their final year of High School and are talking about what they will do in the future. They are antagonized by Kaiba who wishes to face the Pharaoh who has left to the afterlife. Nevertheless, in the final duel the Pharaoh makes a brief appearance to assist Yugi in defeating the corrupted Aigami.

The video game Yu-Gi-Oh! Forbidden Memories follows the Pharaoh's daily life in Egypt until he is sealed into the Millennium Puzzle. Yugi inherits the puzzle and gathers each Millennium item which allows the Pharaoh to deal with his enemies until he keeps peace in his world.

In Yu-Gi-Oh! The Falsebound Kingdom,  Yugi, Joey, Tristan, Téa and Bakura are invited to the testing of the virtual reality game "Kingdom," created by the company SIC. When they enter the game they soon find themselves trapped within it, and they must summon the help of the game's characters and monsters in order to defeat the game's villain, Emperor Heishin, and ultimately stop the plans of the game's designer, Scott Irvine, to control the three Egyptian God cards. Yu-Gi-Oh! Duel Links also uses Yami Yugi as a playable character.

Reception

As the protagonist and franchise mascot of one of the most popular anime of all time, Yugi is considered to be an iconic character in animation, often compared to characters like Ash Ketchum for serving as a figurehead in popularizing anime to a wider audience, as well as corresponding merchandise to people outside of Japan. In an "Anime! Anime!" poll, Yugi was rated as the 9th most popular character voiced by Megumi Ogata.

Critical reception to Yugi and Atem has been mixed. In the book Manga: The Complete Guide, Jason Thompson noted that while Yugi and his friends often end up in complicated situations during the series' first chapters, the portrayal of Yami might come across as negative due to his actions. During later episodes, however, Thompson viewed Yami as an admirable "super hero". In 2013, Thompson again noted Yami's behavior when playing "Penalty Games" on criminal or bullies; he was similar to Batman and Superman because he does not kill enemies but gives them gruesome fates. Fred Ladd also noted Yugi's weakness is due to his inhability to deal with bullies and that his alter-ego seeks revenge for their actions. Ladd said that Yugi and Yami become more developed as characters during the introduction of card games, which are important to the setting, to the series. Thompson agreed, noting that despite Yugi winning most of his duels, Takahashi produces enough drama to make the reader wonder whether he would lose against Pegasus or Marik based on their apparent advantages when playing the game. Briana Lawerence from Mania Entertainment was harsher towards Yugi's actions in the series; she found that Yugi was so nearly unbeatable at Duel Monsters that it was almost pointless for new duelists to challenge him.

THEM Anime Reviews criticized Yugi's characterization and design in 4Kids' adaptation of the manga's second anime series; the website cited the character as a stereotype. DVD Talk was confused by the way Yugi transforms whenever he plays a game because it left the Millennium Puzzle as a mystery. Dan Green from the English cast has been praised for his deliveries as Yugi alongside Eric Stuart (Kaiba). While finding Yugi's victories in the anime ridiculous, Fandom Post still enjoyed the character's actions; the reviewer praised Yami's origins and actions as a Pharaoh, and the way he engages Bakura. The origins of the Pharaoh and his relationship with the priest Seto, Kaiba's previous life, were also praised. For the final duel between the two Yugi, Thompson praised Takahashi's writing because through this duel, both the Pharaoh and the reader are given the message to accept death while Yugi must accept loneliness and become a stronger man.
 
Critics have also commented upon Yugi's role in the movies based on the franchise. DVD Talk found Yugi's troubled situation as Duel Monsters' champion as an annoyance due to its execution but still felt young children should be warmed of it. While enjoying the duel between the protagonists and the villain in Bonds Beyond Time', UK Anime Network  found the three duelists perform moves necessary to introduce their most iconic characters. While reviewing Dark Side of Dimensions, IGN praised Yugi's growth alongside his friends' as they interact, making them more mature than in the manga and anime. IGN, however, wrote that although Yugi appears to be the movie's main character, he is overshadowed by Kaiba. Anime News Network said the emotional impact of the split between Yugi and the Pharaoh was impactful, the latter's cameo during the finale left a good impression. The Fandom Post criticized the obsessive relationship between Kaiba and the Pharaoh, which came across as romantic. Green's performance as the holographic Pharaoh was praised and the regular Yugi's rivalry with Kaiba received a positive response.

Takahashi and Mike Mignola, the creator of Hellboy, participated in an art exchange in which Takahashi drew Hellboy with Yugi's hairstyle, a Millennium Puzzle, and a duel disk, and Mignola drew Hellboy wearing a Millennium Puzzle and a Yugi T-shirt.

References

Anime and manga characters who use magic
Comics characters introduced in 1996
Fictional characters who can manipulate probability
Fictional characters with alter egos
Fictional characters with amnesia
Fictional characters with dissociative identity disorder
Fictional characters with evocation or summoning abilities
Fictional gamblers
Fictional high school students
Fictional Japanese people in anime and manga
Fictional pharaohs
Male characters in anime and manga
Merged fictional characters
Teenage characters in anime and manga
Teenage characters in film
Yu-Gi-Oh! characters